Thomas Barber (fl. 1395), born in Ireland and then settled in Leominster, Herefordshire, was an English politician.

He was a Member (MP) of the Parliament of England for Leominster in 1395.

References

14th-century births
Year of death missing
English MPs 1395
14th-century Irish people
People from Herefordshire